Suhovare (historically Suovare) is a settlement in Poličnik, Dalmatia, Croatia.

History
In 1332, knight Petar Mihovil's possessions and livestock held in the village of Suhovare (Zochovarie) were stolen.

The village was abandoned in 1571, then resettled during the establishment of Ottoman government. The rebuilt village was destroyed in 1646 by Venetian troops. It was restored by returnees following major military actions in the 18th century.

Demographics
According to the 1991 census, the settlement's population was 891, of whom 99.21% were Croats. According to the 2011 census, the total population was 508.

References

Sources

Populated places in Istria County